Art Palace of Georgia - Museum of Cultural History also referred to as Art Palace, (Georgian: საქართველოს ხელოვნების სასახლე – კულტურის ისტორიის მუზეუმი) is located in Tbilisi, Georgia. It is located on Kargareteli Street #6, and was the former Graph Oldenburg's Palace. The museum's exhibition halls are open from Tuesday till Sunday (10:30 - 17:30)

Until April 8, 2020, it was called the Georgian State Museum of Theater, Music, Cinema and Choreography. The name was changed according to the resolution of the Government of Georgia.

History 
Georgian Art Palace - Museum of Cultural History is a depository of Georgian cultural objects. The museum is housed in a building in Tbilisi. It was designed by a well-known architect of the time, Paul Stern, and, as an example of historicism, bears traces of Gothic architecture and Islamic architecture.

In 1882, Duke Constantine Petrovich of Oldenburg (1850-1906), a member of the Russian branch of the House of Oldenburg, met Agrippina Japaridze  in Kutaisi. At the time she was married to Georgian nobleman from the House of Dadiani. Constantine Petrovich confessed his love for her. The confession turned Agrippina's head; they eloped and left Kutaisi and went to settle in Tiflis. Prince Oldenburg commissioned the building of the palace for his beloved as a token of his great affection for her.

In 1927, the Museum of Theatre, founded by David Arsenishvili (1905-1963)- a famous Georgian public figure (later appointed as the First Director of the Andrei Rublev Museum in Moscow), was moved to the building. The museum has more than 300,000 objects that provide information on the development of Georgian theatre, cinema, circus, folklore, opera, and ballet, as well as providing insight into the lives of figures in respective fields.

Some museum exhibits date back to the classical era. Of particular note is an antique mask which was excavated by archeologists in the town of Vani.

Collection of Georgian Fine Arts 
Georgian Art makes up large part of the collection. Around 10,000 exhibits of over 300 Georgian artists inform us about evolution of Georgian scenic design. The depository of fine arts contains portraits of theater actor and directors, sketches of stage decorations and costumes.

Collection of Russian Fine Arts 
Besides Georgian artists, the collection also contains works of Russian painters as well as works of representatives of Russian Silver age World of Art Konstantin Korovin, Lev Bakst, Alexander Benua, Alexander Golovin and Viktor Simov. The union was founded in the beginning of 20th century in St. Peters-burg.

Collection of Western European Fine Arts 
Interest in European art has existed in Georgia since ancient times. Precisely, Western European art became popular in Georgia in 18th century. Representatives of Georgian nobility traveled to Europe frequently and tried to bring the culture, art and traditions back in homeland.

Collection of Persian Fine Arts 
The Art Palace also owns collection of Persian Fine Arts. Collection consists of 4 Qajar miniature Paintings dated back to XIX Century and also painting of King Solomon. As in Jewish and Christian traditions, Islam promotes the ancient King Solomon as a model ruler; wise and just.

References

External links

Museums in Tbilisi
Performing arts museums